TV Southasia was a TV channel from Broadcast Worldwide, the makers of the popular Bengali news channel Tara Newz. It was a combined effort of the broadcasters present in the 5 countries of the South-Asian Region, viz. Bangladesh, Nepal, India, Sri Lanka and Pakistan. Its motto was 'We are you and you are who we are'. The channel was shut down in 2013. Rubana Huq was the CEO of the channel from 2006 to 2010.

Partners
AAJ TV - Pakistan
Image Channel - Nepal
Ekushey TV - Bangladesh
MTV Channel - Sri Lanka
Tara Newz - India

References

Television channels and stations established in 2006
Defunct television channels in India